Tomáš Josef Špidlík, S.J. (17 December 1919 – 16 April 2010) was a Czech prelate of the Roman Catholic Church. He was a Jesuit priest and theologian. Pope John Paul II made him a cardinal in 2003.

Biography
Špidlík was born in 1919 in Boskovice, then Czechoslovakia, now Czech Republic. In 1938, he entered the Department of Philosophy at the University of Brno, in what is now the Czech Republic. In the following year, he entered the Jesuit novitiate and after many interruptions in his education due to World War II, he was ordained a priest of the Society of Jesus on 22 August 1949 in Maastricht. in 1949. A year later, in Florence, he finished his formation period as a Jesuit.

In 1951, Špidlík was called to Rome by Vatican Radio. The programs broadcast to the countries behind the Iron Curtain were a precious aid to a freedom in danger of being slowly but inexorably suffocated. From this work with Vatican Radio sprang a special mission that would always accompany him and that made him known in lands despite their communist domination. Among others, he met with Alexander Dubček, the former first secretary of the Central Committee of the Communist Party of Czechoslovakia, and Václav Havel, who became president of Czechoslovakia and the Czech Republic after the fall of the communist regime. Špidlík's Sunday homilies in Czech have been translated and published in various languages including Polish, Romanian and Italian.

He lived in Rome from 1951 until his death.

In 1995 he delivered the annual Lenten retreat meditations for the pope and officials of the Roman Curia. In June he defended his doctoral dissertation at the Pontifical Oriental Institute in Rome. That year marked the beginning of his university career as a professor of Patristic and Eastern Spiritual Theology at various universities in Rome. Špidlík became known as an expert in the spirituality of Eastern Christianity.

For 38 years he was the spiritual director of the Pontifical Nepomuceno Seminary, the old Bohemian Seminary.

On 21 October 2003, at the age of 83, he was created Cardinal Deacon of the titular church of Sant'Agata dei Goti. Although he was not a voting cardinal, he was created a cardinal in recognition of his theological writings.

The Cardinal was a prolific author and was equally acknowledged in the academic and international fields. He was received at the Kremlin, led the spiritual exercises of Pope John Paul II and his Curia, and was decorated with the medal of the Masaryk Order, one of the highest honors of the Czech State, by president Václav Havel.

In 2005 Špidlík delivered the meditation on the first day of the papal conclave just before the first ballot was taken. Because of age he was not eligible to participate in the voting.

He died in Rome on 16 April 2010.

See also
Vladimir Lossky
Pontifical Oriental Institute

References

Works
Spirituality of the Christian East: A Systematic Handbook (Cistercian Studies) Language: English  
Prayer: The Spirituality of the Christian East Vol.2 Publisher: Liturgical Press (30 July 2005)  
Drinking from the Hidden Fountain: A Patristic Breviary : Ancient Wisdom for Today's World (Cistercian Studies, No 148) Publisher: Cistercian Publications (June 1994)  
Geist und Erkenntnis: Zu spirituellen Grundlagen Europas : Festschrift zum 65. Geburtstag von Prof. ThDr. Tomas Spidlik SJ (Integrale Anthropologie) Publisher: Minerva Publikation (1985) Language: German  
Les grands mystiques russes Publisher: Nouvelle cité (1 January 1995)  
Le chemin de l'esprit: Retraite au Vatican (Initiations) (French Edition) Publisher: Fates (1996) Language: French  
Ignazio di Loyola e la spiritualita Orientale: Guida alla lettura degli Esercizi (Religione e societa) (Italian Edition) Publisher: Edizioni Studium (1994) Language: Italian  
Zive slovo: Denni evangelium (Czech Edition) Publisher: Refugium Velehrad-Roma; Vyd. 1 edition (1997) Language: Czech  
Sculptured Prayer: Twelve works of Helen Zelezny interpreted by Thomaso Spidlik. Rome 1968. Language English. Finito di stampare nello Stabilimento di Arti Grafiche Fratelli Palombi in Roma

External links
Pontifical Oriental Institute Website
Commentario allo schizzo del mosaico per la capella papale (Vaticano)

Czech cardinals
1919 births
2010 deaths
Czech Jesuits
Cardinals created by Pope John Paul II
Recipients of the Order of Tomáš Garrigue Masaryk
Pontifical Oriental Institute alumni
Jesuit cardinals
Jesuit theologians